Karunamayi is a 1987 Indian Kannada-language action drama film directed and co-produced by H. R. Bhargava based on the Kannada novel Kesaru Mosaru by Kakolu Saroja Rao. The film starred Vishnuvardhan and Bhavya along with Tara, K. S. Ashwath and Shivakumar in supporting roles. The film's music is scored by Rajan–Nagendra whilst the cinematography is by D. V. Rajaram who also co-produced the film. Movie became a silver jubilee hit.

The director had revealed that Rajkumar had initially planned to make a film out of the novel on which this movie was based but later opted out after which Bhargava decided to adapt that novel on-screen. P. Vasu, who wrote the screenplay remade the movie in Tamil as Ponmana Selvan with Vijayakanth.

Cast

Vishnuvardhan as Raja
Bhavya
Tara
K. S. Ashwath
Vishwa Vijetha
Pandari Bai
Ramesh Bhat
Doddanna
Shivakumar
Ravishankar
Thimmayya
Chikkanna

Soundtrack
The music of the film was composed by Rajan–Nagendra and lyrics written by Chi. Udaya Shankar.

References

External links
 

1987 films
1980s Kannada-language films
1980s action drama films
Indian action drama films
Films scored by Rajan–Nagendra
Kannada films remade in other languages
Films directed by H. R. Bhargava
1987 drama films